is a Japanese seinen manga magazine which mainly serializes 4-koma manga published by Media Factory. The magazine originally began to be published as a supplement 4-koma magazine in Comic Alive in October 2014 but in June 2015, the publisher announced that Comic Cune would be its own magazine instead of just a supplement for Comic Alive, with the magazine debuting on August 27, 2015 with the titles it had before.

Serialized titles
Alice or Alice
Akarui Kioku Soushitsu
Gal to Otaku wa Wakariaenai
Harukiya-san wa Ijippri
Hinako Note 
Karin-chan wa Misetagari
Lulumate
Ms. Vampire Who Lives in My Neighborhood
Neeko wa Tsurai yo
Nyanko Days
Nyoroko no Nama Hōsō!
Pan de Peace!
Popopo no Oneesan
Sakura Maimai
Seishun Sweet Track
Sekai de Ichiban Oppai ga Suki!
Shimeji Simulation
Shiritsu Seijō Gakuen Kirarin Ryō
Siscon Onee-chan to Ki ni Shinai Imouto
Spirits & Cat Ears
Watashi no Go-shūjin-sama wa Ningen Janai Ki ga Suru

Anime adaptations 
 Pan de Peace! - Spring 2016
 Nyanko Days - Winter 2017
 Hinako Note - Spring 2017
 Alice or Alice - Spring 2018
 Ms. Vampire Who Lives in My Neighborhood - Fall 2018

References

External links
Official website 

2015 establishments in Japan
Magazines established in 2015
Magazines published in Tokyo
Monthly manga magazines published in Japan
Media Factory magazines
Seinen manga magazines